Trzebiatkowa  is a village in the administrative district of Gmina Tuchomie, within Bytów County, Pomeranian Voivodeship, in northern Poland.

The village has a population of 475.

Notable residents
 Hans von Greiffenberg (1893-1951), Wehrmacht general

References

Trzebiatkowa